The closing ceremony of the 1984 Summer Olympics took place at the Los Angeles Memorial Coliseum in Los Angeles, California on Sunday, August 12 1984 at 20:00 PDT.

Preparation and pre-ceremony

The 23,000 square foot stage on center pitch, about a third of the size of the field, cost $500,000 ($1.2 million in 2020). Constructed in four weeks, it arrived and was installed in 12 hours by 300 workers. One ring of the lower level served as a pit for the 60-member Los Angeles Olympic Symphony Orchestra, while the three other rings were filled with water six inches deep.

The ceremony was directed by David Wolper and Tommy Walker. They also hired producer Daniel Flannery and his production company.
Flannery was the conceptualist working directly with Wolper and Walker. Once the ceremonies were conceived, the Los Angeles Olympic Organizing Committee (LAOOC) contracted Flannery to produce them and his firm to supervise the special effects and special lighting of the ceremony. This included designing the famous spaceship and alien. Flashlights were given to all 92,000 attendees, with three interchangeable colors: red, white and blue. The Coliseum announcer was Charles Corsen.

In a pre-recorded interview during the ABC broadcast, International Olympic Committee president Juan Antonio Samaranch declared to journalist Peter Jennings that the games scored a "10" out of 10.

Marathon and Equestrian Victory Ceremonies

The medals will be presented by Juan Antonio Samaranch, IOC President. Accompanied by Primo Nebiolo, IAAF President. The final victory ceremony was held to the three Men's marathon medalists : 

 Carlos Lopes - Gold John Treacy  - Silver Charles Spedding - Bronze

The marathon began at 5:00 p.m., before the start of the ceremony, and the finish line was the Coliseum. Some runners staggered in with cheers from the crowd. Marathon winners were awarded their medals, with Portugal's Carlos Lopes being awarded the gold. His national anthem was played.

The medals will be presented by Lord Killanin, Honorary Life IOC President. Accompanied by Fritz O. Widmer, Secretary General of the International Equestrian Federation. 
And the final victory ceremony was held to the three Individual jumping medalists :

 Joe Fargis - Gold Conrad Homfeld  - Silver Heidi Robbiani - Bronze

Traditionally, during past Olympic Games, the final equestrian event was also held at the Olympic stadium on the day of the closing ceremony. However, Los Angeles held the event the day before at another location, so as not to damage the coliseum field or stage preparation. Instead, the three medal winners rode in on horseback and paraded to the medal podium during the pre-ceremony. After the U.S. anthem was played for gold medal winner Joseph Fargis, they took a victory lap again on horseback around the coliseum, to cheers from the crowd.

Ceremony
As in the opening ceremony, city church bells rang to commence the start of the ceremony.

Parade of Nations 

In previous Olympic Games, only six athletes from each country's delegation were allowed to attend the closing ceremony. In 1984, for the first time ever, the LAOOC allowed all athletes wishing to attend to do so, resulting in over 6,000 athletes marching into the stadium. The 1984 "Olympic Fanfare and Theme", composed by John Williams, was performed in the Coliseum peristyle by the 750-member Olympic All American Marching Band. Other songs were performed while the flag bearers, country name placards and, finally, the athletes of 140 nations marched en masse.

Anthems and Antwerp Ceremony
The national anthems of Greece (by tradition), the United States (the host nation) and then South Korea (the next host city) were played. On center stage, Los Angeles mayor Tom Bradley was joined by IOC president Juan Antonio Samaranch and the Mayor of Seoul, South Korea, Yom Po-hyun, for the Antwerp flag transfer, which was passed from Bradley to Samaranch to Po-hyun. American children of different races gifted Korean children silver Olympic coins and in exchange the Korean children gifted the American children traditional Korean jewelry boxes. Ludwig van Beethoven's "Ode to Joy" was then performed by the symphony.

A delegation from Seoul, the host city of the 1988 Summer Olympic Games, performed a traditional Buchaechum. The dance was performed by the Seoul City Dance Theater, who were joined by the 1986 Asian Games and 1988 Summer Olympic mascot Hodori, the Asian tiger. The Dance Theater of Harlem then performed the Stars and Stripes ballet by George Balanchine to reciprocate.

Speeches and closing declaration
LAOOC president Peter Ueberroth delivered a speech, and IOC president Samaranch delivered a speech in English, awarding the Olympic Order in Gold to Ueberroth. Samaranch then declared the Games of the XXIII Olympiad in Los Angeles closed and, in accordance with tradition, called upon the youth of the world to assemble four years from now in Seoul to celebrate the Games of the XXIV Olympiad. The Olympic flag was lowered by selected citizens of Los Angeles, while the Olympic Hymn was performed and sung by the symphony. Four loud firework booms sounded and military trumpeters appeared above the cauldron. Actor Richard Basehart read from the Greek lyric poet Pindar's Ode to Olympians. As Basehart read the last refrain, the Olympic flame was then extinguished.

Entertainment
During the start of the entertainment section, the Coliseum announcers informed the audience to set their flashlights to blue and turn them on at the count of three. As the blue lights came on, the symphony played the introduction ("Einleitung") of Thus Spoke Zarathustra by Richard Strauss. A flying UFO then appeared above the stadium. The stage lit up and "spoke" to the spaceship with lights in dueling form, using a sequence of notes from the "Olympic Fanfare and Theme", similar to the ending of the 1977 film Close Encounters of the Third Kind. The Coliseum arches glowed and the peristyle lit up from behind and simulated the spaceship landing. A laser show within the Coliseum commenced. At the end, a 7-foot tall "alien" appeared above the parapet of the cauldron and announced that the city and humanity had kept "the ideals of the Olympics", declaring, "I salute you".

Fireworks show
The fireworks show was a salute to every Olympic city. Each city was announced to the audience, followed by a quick anecdote, and each city's national folk music was played by the symphony to accompany the display.

Examples of music:

Paris – "Galop infernal" (the can-can)
Berlin – "Ride of the Valkyries"
London – "The River Kwai March"
Melbourne – "Waltzing Matilda"
Los Angeles – "The Stars and Stripes Forever"

Final last closing events
Lionel Richie performed an extended version of his No. 1 hit song "All Night Long", accompanied by breakdancers. Confetti rained on the stadium with large scale balloons. Athletes remained on the field and danced as American pop music played. A large display of fireworks followed and ended the show along with a rendition by all the musical performers. The very last final closing farewell musical song "Auld Lang Syne" was sung, ending the closing ceremony at 00:00 PDT to mark the end of the 1984 Summer Olympics, saying "Farewell Los Angeles, See You in 1988 Seoul - Korea".

Attendees
 Henry Winkler
 Cary Grant
 Vice President Bush
 Prince Philip, Duke of Edinburgh
 Governor of California George Deukmejian
 Prime Minister of Canada Brian Mulroney
 Prime Minister of South Korea Chin Lee-Chong

Anthems
All anthems were performed by the Olympic All American Marching Band.
 National Anthem of Greece
 National Anthem of the United States of America 
 National Anthem of South Korea
 Olympic Hymn
 National Anthem of Portugal

Notes

References

Closing Ceremony
Ceremonies in the United States
Olympics closing ceremonies